Pentrecelyn is a rural village in Denbighshire, North East Wales just off the A525 between Ruthin and Wrexham. 
The village can be located by turning off the A525 at Llysfasi college and heading towards Graigfechan.

Villages in Denbighshire